The 2007 World Wushu Championships was the 9th edition of the World Wushu Championships. It was held at the Olympic Sports Center Gymnasium in Beijing, China from November 11 to November 17, 2007. Nearly 1,000 athletes from 89 IWUF national federations participated in the event. The competition also acted as a qualifier for the 2008 Beijing Wushu Tournament and the 2009 World Games.

Medal summary

Medal table

Men's taolu

Men's sanda

Women's taolu

Women's sanda

References 



World Wushu Championships
Wushu Championships
World Wushu Championships, 2007
2007 in wushu (sport)
Wushu competitions in China